Vitali Gennadyevich Astakhov (born 9 January 1979) is a Russian former professional footballer.

Club career
He made his debut in the Russian Premier League in 2002 for FC Torpedo-ZIL Moscow.

References

1979 births
Sportspeople from Samara, Russia
Living people
Russian footballers
Association football goalkeepers
FC Moscow players
FC Fakel Voronezh players
FC Baltika Kaliningrad players
Russian Premier League players
FC Volga Nizhny Novgorod players
FC Sodovik Sterlitamak players
FC Tom Tomsk players
FC Orenburg players